Agrilus anxius, the bronze birch borer, is a wood-boring buprestid beetle native to North America, more numerous in warmer parts of the continent and rare in the north. It is a serious pest on birch trees (Betula), frequently killing them. The river birch Betula nigra is the most resistant species, other American birches less so, while the European and Asian birches have no resistance to it at all and are effectively impossible to grow in the eastern United States as a result.

It is closely related to the emerald ash borer.

References

External links
US Forest Service factsheet

Woodboring beetles
anxius
Beetles described in 1841